Hector Turnbull (September 11, 1884 – April 8, 1934) was an American screenwriter and film producer. He wrote for 25 films between 1915 and 1937. He was born in Arlington, New Jersey and died in New Hope, Pennsylvania from a heart attack.

Selected filmography
 The Cheat (1915)
 Temptation (1915)
 The Heart of Nora Flynn (1916)
 Alien Souls (1916)
 Less Than the Dust (1916)
 The Evil Eye (1917)
 Everything for Sale (1921)
 My American Wife (1922)
 Mantrap (1926)
 Casey at the Bat (1927)
 Underworld (1927)
 Marked Money (1928)
 Morocco (1930)
 The Cheat (1931)
 The Cheat (1937, original screenplay)

References

External links

1884 births
1934 deaths
American male screenwriters
American film producers
People from New Jersey
20th-century American male writers
20th-century American screenwriters